Pondo  may refer to:
 Pondo people, Xhosa speaking ethnic group who have given their name to Pondoland
 Pondo Water-Control Project, reservoir and dam on the Kyi River in Lhünzhub County to the east of Lhasa, Tibet, China
 Nor–Pondo languages, small language family of northern Papua New Guinea
 Mad Man Pondo, American professional wrestler
 Pana language, Mbum language of the Central African Republic